Skattungbyn is a locality situated in Orsa Municipality, Dalarna County, Sweden with 310 inhabitants in 2015.

References 

Populated places in Dalarna County
Populated places in Orsa Municipality